Guitar Hero III: Legends of Rock is a video game. It may also refer to:

 Guitar Hero III Mobile
 Guitar Hero III: Backstage Pass
 Guitar Hero III: Legends of Rock Companion Pack